Von Sternberg may refer to:

 Constantin Ivanovich von Sternberg (1852–1924), composer
 Josef von Sternberg (1894–1969), American film director
 Kaspar Maria von Sternberg (1761–1838), Bohemian theologian and botanist
 Richard M. von Sternberg, American scientist and intelligent design proponent
 Ungern-Sternberg Family:
 Roman Ungern von Sternberg (1886–1921), Russian military commander

See also 
Sternberg